Chamina Ben Mohamed is a Comorian politician.

She is a member of the Assembly of the Union of the Comoros.

References

Living people
Comorian politicians
Members of the Assembly of the Union of the Comoros
21st-century Comorian women politicians
21st-century Comorian politicians
Year of birth missing (living people)